HRHD (high-resolution high-definition) (also HR, HRHDTV, or HR.HDTV) is an initialism referring to an image resolution derived from high-definition video, often seen as part of the filename of TV shows shared on the Internet. HRHD is an unofficial standard of encoding video, meaning that the video signal was ripped directly from an HDTV broadcast, then downsampled to approximately 960 × 540, and usually encoded with Xvid. While the horizontal resolution of 960 remains constant the vertical resolution can fluctuate up to 5% to provide clean cropping. It is sometimes erroneously referred to as Half-Resolution High-Definition.

Encoding for a 40–55-minute HRHD TV show should be approximately 700 MB, the size of a compact disc. It contains the original AC3 sound, which is often 5.1 channels, instead of the re-encoded stereo MP3 stream found in 350MB releases.

History
The HRHD format began in late 2003 when the TV capture group FUA began distributing what they termed "HRHDTV rips" on the private FTP sites of The Scene.  The group defined what HRHDTV is in their .nfo, a small text file included with releases to give information specific to the release.

There has often been a misconception about the name.  Some mistakenly think the term means half-resolution high-definition.  HRHD resolution is actually ¾ height and width of 720p  video.  By area, the picture is 56.25% of the typical 720p HD broadcast.  The HRHD dimensions are precisely half of 1080p video, but this yields only 25% of the original 1080p picture information.

See also
 Pirated movie release types
 Standard (warez)

References

High-definition television
Standards
Warez